Trichostetha coetzeri is an afrotropical species of flower scarab beetle endemic to South Africa, where it occurs in the Cape Floristic Region. It was first described by Perissinotto, Šípek & Ball, 2014.

References

Endemic beetles of South Africa
Cetoniinae
Beetles described in 2014